Michael Edward Reagan (born March 18, 1945) is an American political commentator, Republican strategist, and former radio talk show host. He is the adopted son of former U.S. president Ronald Reagan and his first wife, actress Jane Wyman. He works as a columnist for Newsmax.

Early life
Michael Edward Reagan was born John Charles Flaugher at Hollywood Presbyterian Medical Center in Los Angeles to Essie Irene Flaugher (October 18, 1916 – December 26, 1985), an unmarried woman from Kentucky who became pregnant through a relationship with John Bourgholtzer, a U.S. Army corporal. He was adopted by Ronald Reagan and Jane Wyman shortly after his birth.

He was expelled from Loyola High School after a short period of time at the school and in 1964, he graduated from the Judson School, a boarding school outside of Scottsdale, Arizona. He attended Arizona State University for less than one semester and Los Angeles Valley College but never graduated.

In 1965, the FBI warned Ronald Reagan that in the course of an organized crime investigation it had discovered his son Michael was associating with the son of crime boss Joseph Bonanno, which would have become a campaign issue had it been publicly known. Reagan thanked the FBI and said he would tell his son to discreetly discontinue the association.

Careers

Salesman
Sometime prior to September 1970, Reagan was working as a salesman for the clothing company Hart, Schaffner & Marx. He then became a director of special events catering at Michaelson Food Service Company in Los Angeles. In 1981, Reagan was hired as a salesman for Industrial Circuits, a circuit board company owned by Robert Herring Sr.

Actor
Reagan has had small roles in movies and television shows since 1985, including Falcon Crest, which starred his mother, Jane Wyman.

Television
In 1987, Reagan served as the host for the first season of the television game show Lingo.

Radio
His work in talk radio started in the Southern California local market as a guest host for radio commentator Michael Jackson's talk radio show slot on KABC in Los Angeles. After this beginning, he landed a talk show spot on KSDO radio in San Diego.

Reagan also hosted The Michael Reagan Show nationwide for most of the 2000s. The show was variously syndicated on Premiere Networks and Radio America. Since then he has focused on public speaking about his father.

Author
In 1988, he wrote, with Joe Hyams, an autobiography, Michael Reagan: On the Outside Looking In. He also wrote that he was sexually abused at the age of seven by a camp counselor.

In 2005, he wrote Twice Adopted about his feelings of rejection being adopted, parents divorcing and becoming a born-again Christian.

Political commentary

Same-sex marriage
In April 2013, in a syndicated column, Reagan accused American churches of not fighting hard enough to block same-sex marriage. He wrote that, in regard to arguments supporting gay marriage, similar arguments could be used to support polygamy, bestiality, and murder. As he wrote: "There is also a very slippery slope leading to other alternative relationships and the unconstitutionality of any law based on morality. Think about polygamy, bestiality, and perhaps even murder."

Call for the execution of Mark Dice
In June 2008, Mark Dice launched a campaign urging people to send letters and DVDs to US troops stationed in Iraq which support the theory that the September 11 attacks were an "inside job". "Operation Inform the Soldiers", as Dice has called it, prompted Reagan to comment that Dice should be executed for treason. Fairness and Accuracy in Reporting, a liberal/progressive media criticism organization, asked Radio America at the time to explain whether it permits "its hosts to call for murder on the air".

Support for profiling
He spoke out in support of profiling in October 2014. In a piece called Profile or Die, he wrote that it would be left to citizens to defend themselves if there were an attack against them by terrorists such as the Islamic State.

Legal problems
In 1981, Reagan was accused of felony violations of California securities laws in court documents. The Los Angeles County District Attorney alleged that Reagan had baited investors into unlawful stock arrangements, and selling stocks despite the fact that he was not legally permitted to do so. The D.A.'s office investigated allegations that Reagan improperly spent money invested by others in a company, Agricultural Energy Resources, he operated out of his house in a venture to develop the potential of gasohol, a combination of alcohol and gasoline. Investigators said they were also checking whether he had spent up to $17,500 of investors' money for his living expenses. The district attorney's office cleared Reagan of both charges later that year.

On September 20, 2012, Reagan, Tim Kelly and Jay Hoffman were sued by a fellow partner, for allegedly withholding the partner's interest in an e-mail business built around the Reagan.com domain name. In 2015, a Los Angeles Superior Court jury found Reagan liable for conversion and breach of fiduciary duty. Reagan and his business partners were ordered to pay $662,500 each in damages.

Personal life
In June 1971, Reagan married Pamela Gail Putnam (born 1952), daughter of Duane Putnam, former Atlanta Falcons football line coach. The couple divorced in 1972.

He married Colleen Sterns, an interior decorator, in 1975 at The Church on the Way. They have two children, Cameron and Ashley. Reagan and his wife live in the Toluca Lake area of Los Angeles.

In January 2011, he called his adoptive brother Ron Reagan, the biological son of Ronald Reagan and his second wife, Nancy Davis Reagan,  "an embarrassment" for speculating in a memoir that their father suffered from Alzheimer's disease while president.

References

External links
 

1945 births
Living people
20th-century American writers
21st-century American non-fiction writers
American adoptees
American autobiographers
American conservative talk radio hosts
American game show hosts
American male journalists
American people of German descent
American political commentators
American talk radio hosts
California Republicans
Children of presidents of the United States
Journalists from California
Radio programs on XM Satellite Radio
Reagan family
Writers from Los Angeles
21st-century American male writers